is a major real estate developer in Japan. Mitsui Fudosan is one of the core companies of Mitsui Group.

Corporate structure
The company is organized into four divisions.

Office Building Division
Real Estate Solution Services Division
Accommodation Business Division
Retail Properties Division

Major projects
In Tokyo, Mitsui undertook a major redevelopment project in the Nihonbashi district, where group founder Takatoshi Mitsui had his kimono shop during the 17th century. Mitsui also developed the "Gran Tokyo North Tower" office building at Tokyo Station.
In New York City, Mitsui's first major project was the 2.3 million square foot Exxon Building (1251 Avenue of the Americas), which it acquired in the 1980s. It subsequently engaged in several other projects in the city together with local partners. It has announced plans to invest up to $1.25 billion in the 51-story 50 Hudson Yards tower as part of the Hudson Yards Redevelopment Project, which would be the largest overseas project by a Japanese real estate company in history.
In Honolulu, Hawaii, Mitsui owns and operates the iconic Halekulani hotel on Waikiki Beach.
In Shanghai, it launched Mitsui Shopping Park LaLaport Shanghai Jinqiao, the first LaLaport to open outside of Japan.
In Taiwan, it had launched Mitsui Outlet Park Linkou, Mitsui Outlet Park Taichung Port and Mitsui Outlet Park Tainan.
In Malaysia, Sepang, Mitsui had launched the Mitsui Outlet Park KLIA Sepang which was opened in July 2015, while the second phase of the outlet mall was opened in February 2018.
In Malaysia, Kuala Lumpur, Mitsui had launched its first LaLaport mall in Southeast Asia known as Mitsui Shopping Park LaLaport Bukit Bintang City Centre located within the Bukit Bintang City Centre (BBCC) development, in collaboration with BBCC Development Sdn Bhd under a joint-venture agreement. Another upcoming project known as Mitsui Serviced Suites will also be constructed as part of Phase 2 of the BBCC’s masterplan.

Global network
Outside of Japan, the company currently owns 12 branch offices.

Mitsui Fudosan America, Inc.
Halekulani Corporation
Mitsui Fudosan (U.K.) Ltd.
Mitsui Fudosan (Asia) Pte. Ltd.
Mitsui Fudosan (Shanghai) Consulting Co., Ltd.
Mitsui Fudosan Consulting (Beijing) Co., Ltd.
Mitsui Fudosan Consulting (Guangzhou) Co., Ltd.
Mitsui Fudosan (Asia) Malaysia Sdn. Bhd.
Mitsui Fudosan Australia Pty. Ltd.
Mitsui Fudosan Asia (Thailand) Co., Ltd.
Mitsui Fudosan Taiwan Co., Ltd.
Mitsui Fudosan Co., Ltd. Hong Kong Branch

See also

 Hara Model Railway Museum, a model railway museum in Yokohama managed by Mitsui Fudosan
 Snoopy Concert
The Oriental Land Company

References

External links

 

 
Real estate companies established in 1941
Real estate companies based in Tokyo
Mitsui
Japanese companies established in 1941
Companies listed on the Tokyo Stock Exchange